Acemya pyrrhocera is a species of bristle fly in the family Tachinidae.

Distribution
Tajikistan, China, Italy, Spain, France, Mongolia, Russia, United Arab Emirates.

References

Exoristinae
Diptera of Asia
Insects described in 1922
Taxa named by Joseph Villeneuve de Janti